Sweet Inquest on Violence is a 1982 French drama film directed by Gérard Guérin. It was entered into the 1982 Cannes Film Festival.

Cast
 Michael Lonsdale - Ash, le financier
 Elise Caron - France
 Jeanne Herviale - La vieille dame
 Albert Marcoeur - Musicien
 Emmanuelle Debever - Marianne
 Claude Duneton - Paulo l'aveugle
 Nada Strancar - La soeur d'un terroriste / Visiteuse de l'appartement
 Robert Kramer - Le biologiste
 Prune Bergé - Madame Ash
 Mustapha Ami - Terroriste
 Caro - Terroriste
 Eva Hiller - Terroriste
 Zarah Lorelle - Terroriste
 Claude Hébert - Terroriste
 Walter Jones - Walter

References

External links

1982 films
1980s French-language films
1982 drama films
French drama films
1980s French films